Larsøya, sometimes anglicized as Lars Island, is a rocky island, less than  long, which lies just off the southwestern extremity of the island of Bouvetøya  in the South Atlantic Ocean. It was first roughly charted in 1898 by a German expedition under Carl Chun. The Norwegian expedition under Captain Harald Horntvedt made a landing on the island from the ship Norvegia in December 1927, and named it after Lars Christensen, sponsor of the expedition.

See also 
List of Antarctic and subantarctic islands

References

 

Landforms of Bouvet Island